Cannabis culture describes a social atmosphere or series of associated social behaviors that depends heavily upon cannabis consumption, particularly as an entheogen, recreational drug and medicine.

Historically cannabis has been used an entheogen to induce spiritual experiences – most notably in the Indian subcontinent since the Vedic period dating back to approximately 1500 BCE, but perhaps as far back as 2000 BCE. Its entheogenic use was also recorded in Ancient China, the Germanic peoples, the Celts, Ancient Central Asia, and Africa. In modern times, spiritual use of the plant is mostly associated with the Rastafari movement of Jamaica. Several Western subcultures have had marijuana consumption as an idiosyncratic feature, such as hippies, beatniks, hipsters (both the 1940s subculture and the contemporary subculture), ravers and hip hop.

Cannabis has now "evolved its own language, humour, etiquette, art, literature and music." Nick Brownlee writes: "Perhaps because of its ancient mystical and spiritual roots, because of the psychotherapeutic effects of the drug and because it is illegal, even the very act of smoking a joint has deep symbolism." However, the culture of cannabis as "the manifestation of introspection and bodily passivity" — which has generated a negative "slacker" stereotype around its consumers — is a relatively modern concept, as cannabis has been consumed in various forms for almost 5,000 years. New research published in the International Journal of Neuropsychopharmacology claims to have refuted the "lazy stoner stereotype". The study finds that regular cannabis users were no more likely than non-users to be apathetic or anhedonic (to experience a loss of interest or pleasure).

The counterculture of the 1960s has been identified as the era that "sums up the glory years of modern cannabis culture," with the Woodstock Festival serving as "the pinnacle of the hippie revolution in the USA, and in many people's opinion the ultimate example of cannabis culture at work". The influence of cannabis has encompassed holidays (most notably 4/20), cinema (such as the exploitation and stoner film genres), music (particularly jazz, reggae, psychedelia and rap music), and magazines including High Times and Cannabis Culture. Cannabis culture has also infiltrated chess culture, whereby the "Bongcloud Attack" denotes a highly risky opening sequence.

Social custom

Cannabis was once sold in clubs known as "Teapads" during Prohibition in the United States; jazz was usually played at these clubs. Cannabis use was often viewed to be of lower class and was disliked by many. After the outlawing of cannabis, its consumption became covert. Decades later cannabis became once again tolerated by some regions' legislation. Customs have formed around the consumption of cannabis such as 420, named after the popular time of day to consume cannabis (4:20 p.m.) and celebrated on April 20 (4/20). If consumed in a social setting it is encouraged to share cannabis with others.

Use of euphemisms

Euphemisms have long been used by subcultures to identify parts of their culture, and this pertains especially to subcultures of things that are taboo, including cannabis. Cannabis as a product has among the highest number of direct euphemisms, with even more for related elements of cannabis culture. One of the most common cannabis euphemisms, 420, was coined in the 1970s, but other terms are centuries older. A slang scholar, Jonathon Green, noted in 2017 that even though various countries and US states were decriminalizing and legalizing cannabis, more slang terms were still being coined; he suggested that while the need for euphemisms was originally because of the illegality, it had become part of the culture as those using the slang terms did not focus on the legal status of the drug, telling Time that coming up with new slang terms "is also simply fun". However, in 2021, it was suggested by researchers that new euphemisms were still being coined so as to evade internet censors and automated moderation, so that members of cannabis subcultures could discuss their use online even as common slang terms were added to banned word lists. They also suggested that, for this reason, many of the more recent euphemisms repurposed common words with innocuous meanings, as these words are less likely to be banned (it gave the example of "pot", though this is older).

The use of euphemisms and other related argot also identifies a person as belonging to a complex subculture of cannabis use both globally and regionally, with different terms in different regions. The argot also contributes to the identity of these subcultures by "provid[ing] socially constructed ways of talking, thinking, expressing, communicating and interacting among marijuana users and distributors. [...] These words convey the dynamic expressiveness involved in shared consumption and as a comprehensive communication system among subculture participants."

In the arts

As the psychoactive effects of cannabis include increased appreciation of the arts, including and especially music, as well as increased creativity, its influence and usefulness can be found in a variety of works. While coded names of cannabis appeared in music as early as the 1920s, such as Louis Armstrong's song, "Muggles," it wasn't until the 1960s and 70s when more artists began referencing it explicitly. Songs famous for their cannabis-centric lyrics produced during this time include "Got to Get You into My Life" by The Beatles, "Rainy Day Women#12 and 35" by Bob Dylan, and Black Sabbath's "Sweet Leaf."

Today, countless artists, not constrained to any drug-culture-specific genre, have opened up about their substance consumption and how it has inspired their works. Snoop Dogg's love of marijuana is very well known, having created his own line of weed, vaporizer pen, and website focusing on cannabis culture. Willie Nelson, who owns a cannabis company called Willie's Reserve, has even said that smoking saved his life.  Willie’s Reserve Label, is known for promoting social reform in hopes of ending marijuana and hemp prohibitions; it also partners with local Colorado growers, extractors and edibles makers for his wholesale brand. Where as Jay-Z also represents TPCO, which is now one of the largest cannabis companies in the world as a 'Visionary Officer'. Young artist's like Greg Welch produce hundreds of pieces of art using cannabis flowers and other related stuffs. Other contemporary artists who have been vocal about their cannabis use include Miley Cyrus, Jay-Z, Lady Gaga, Zayn Malik, Wiz Khalifa, Rihanna, and Dave Chappelle.

The Marley Family, to keep Bob Marley's legacy alive started Marley Natural in 2016. Sound Tribe Sector 9 now being part of Colorado’s cannabis culture, now partnered with Green Dot Labs to release exclusive hash pens.  Wiz Khalifa's WeedFarm app (launched in 2017) help's play users on creating their own cannabis brands.

Cultures

Cannabis — the plant that produces hemp and hashish — has been one of the most used psychoactive drugs in the world since the late 20th century, following only tobacco and alcohol in popularity. According to Vera Rubin, the use of cannabis has been encompassed by two major cultural complexes over time: a continuous, traditional folk stream, and a more circumscribed, contemporary configuration. The former involves both sacred and secular use, and is usually based on small-scale cultivation: the use of the plant for cordage, clothing, medicine, food, and a "general use as an euphoriant and symbol of fellowship." The second stream of expansion of cannabis use encompasses "the use of hemp for commercial manufacturers utilizing large-scale cultivation primarily as a fiber for mercantile purposes"; but it is also linked to the search for psychedelic experiences (which can be traced back to the formation of the Parisian Club des Hashischins).

Cannabis has been used in the ancient past in places such as ancient India, Romania, Egypt, and Mesopotamia. It was often used as medicine or for hemp, its main route of consumption was smoking. In addition, the plant holds cultural significance in many Eurasian countries. Hemp is associated within cultural rituals like marriage, death, birth, healing, protection, and purification. In some Eastern European folklore, hemp links a spirit to the afterlife.

Over time the culture became more international and a general "cannabis culture" formed. The culture has been responsible for the genre of films known as stoner films, which has come to be accepted as a mainstream cinema movement. In the United States the culture has also spawned its own celebrities (such as Tommy Chong and Terence McKenna), and magazines such as (Cannabis Culture and High Times).

India

Cannabis is indigenous to the Indian subcontinent. Cannabis is also known to have been used by the ancient Hindus of the Indian subcontinent thousands of years ago. The herb is called ganja or ganjika in Sanskrit and other modern Indo-Aryan languages. Some scholars suggest that the ancient drug soma, mentioned in the Vedas, was cannabis, although this theory is disputed.

Today cannabis is often formed into bhang, which has become an integral part of tradition and custom in the Indian subcontinent. In some sections of rural India, people attribute various medicinal properties to the cannabis plant. If taken in proper quantity, bhang is believed to cure fever, dysentery, sunstroke, to clear phlegm, aid in digestion, appetite, cure speech imperfections and lisping, and give alertness to the body.

Jamaica

By the 8th century, cannabis had been introduced by Arab traders to Central and Southern Africa, where it is known as "dagga" and many Rastas say it is a part of their African culture that they are reclaiming. It is sometimes also referred to as "the healing of the nation", a phrase adapted from Revelation 22:2.

Alternatively, the migration of many thousands of Hindus and Muslims from British India to the Caribbean in the 20th century may have brought this culture to Jamaica. Many academics point to Indo-Caribbean origins for the ganja sacrament resulting from the importation of Indian migrant workers in a post-abolition Jamaican landscape. "Large scale use of ganja in Jamaica  ... dated from the importation of indentured Indians...."(Campbell 110). Dreadlocked mystics Jata, often ascetic known as sadhus or Sufi Qalandars and Derwishes, have smoked cannabis from both chillums and coconut shell hookahs in South Asia since the ancient times. Also, the reference of "chalice" may be a transliteration of "jam-e-qalandar" (a term used by Sufi ascetics meaning 'bowl or cup of qalandar'). In South Asia, in addition to smoking, cannabis is often consumed as a drink known as bhang and most qalandars carry a large wooden pestle for that reason.

United States
Marijuana's history in American culture began during the Colonial Era. During this time, hemp was a critical crop, so colonial governments in Virginia and Massachusetts required land-owning farmers to grow marijuana for hemp-based products. Two of the nation's founding fathers, Thomas Jefferson and George Washington, were notable cultivators of hemp. Another Colonial Era figure, John Adams, was a recreational user and wrote about hemp's mind-altering powers.

Beatnik

Marijuana use was associated with the subculture, and during the 1950s, Aldous Huxley's 1954 book The Doors of Perception further influenced views on drugs. This would later influence the hippie movement.

Hippie

Following in the footsteps of the Beatniks, many hippies used cannabis, considering it pleasurable and benign.

Hipster

The term "Hipsters" define two cultural groups, the 1940s subculture dedicated to jazz, and the contemporary subculture today. Both are stereotyped as enjoying cannabis. In fact the early hipsters of the 1940s had many slang terms dedicated to the drug and its distribution.

Events

Notable cannabis-related events have included the Cannabis Cup, Global Marijuana March, Hanfparade, High Times Medical Cannabis Cup, MardiGrass, Spannabis, and Tokers Bowl.

Annual events in the United States include the Boise Hempfest, Emerald Empire Hempfest, Freedom Rally, Great Midwest Marijuana Harvest Festival, Hash Bash, Missoula Hempfest, Moscow Hemp Fest, National Cannabis Festival, National Cannabis Summit, Olympia Hempfest, Portland Hempstalk Festival, Salem Hempfest, and Seattle Hempfest.

Media
Media coverage of marijuana has progressed in recent history. Attention and coverage of the drug began in the 1930s when fabricated horror stories of its effects were used to scare the public and influence public opinion. To push the negative connotations of marijuana even more, films such as Marihuana (1936) and Reefer Madness (1937) were created.

Cannabis-related media include Cannabis Planet, High Times, Stoner TV and Weedtuber. Websites include Leafly, MassRoots, Merry Jane, Price of Weed, and Wikileaf.

The social game Pot Farm created "the largest cannabis community on earth", with 20 million unique players across its platforms and a 2011 figure of over 1 million users on Facebook.

See also

Coffee culture
Drinking culture
Drug culture
Entheogenic use of cannabis
List of books about cannabis
List of cannabis columns
Kava culture
Tea culture

Notes

References

External links
 "The Best Stoner Novels" Daily Beast, April 2010